Pabellon Municipal de Deportes La Casilla is a 5,000-seat arena in Bilbao, Spain, primarily used for basketball. It was the home arena of Bilbao Basket.

References

External links

Indoor arenas in Spain
Basketball venues in Spain
Sports venues in the Basque Country (autonomous community)
Buildings and structures in Bilbao
Sport in Bilbao
Bilbao Basket